Vilhelm Hellman (7 December 1922 – 7 November 1991) was a Swedish ski jumper. He competed in the individual event at the 1948 Winter Olympics.

References

External links
 

1922 births
1991 deaths
Swedish male ski jumpers
Olympic ski jumpers of Sweden
Ski jumpers at the 1948 Winter Olympics
People from Örnsköldsvik Municipality
Sportspeople from Västernorrland County
20th-century Swedish people